Poropuntius laoensis is a species of ray-finned fish in the genus Poropuntius from the Mekong in Myanmar, Thailand, Laos and Vietnam. It is found in clear forested streams and is not found in large rivers. Id does not persist in impoundments and is not known to migrate. It feeds mainly on insect larvae.

References 

laoensis
Fish described in 1868
Taxa named by Albert Günther